FAM135B is a human gene coding for a protein of unknown function. It is well conserved in primates, rodents, zebra fish. It has one paralog, FAM135A.

Gene 

FAM135B is located on the long arm of Chromosome 8 in humans on the anti-sense located at 24.23. The following genes are near FAM135B on the chromosome:
 COL22A1: Collagen producing gene that is a cell adhesion ligand for skin epithelial cells and fibroblast
 FLJ45972: Gene function is unknown
 KCNK9: Gene that encodes for a two pore potassium channel

Expression 

FAM135B is expressed in the brain, ear, eye, pancreas and testis. Within the brain, expression is apparent within the motor nucleus of trigeminal  In addition, it is mainly expressed in normal health states, although it has shown moderate expression in glioma, non-neoplasima as well as expression in germ cell tumors.

Interactions 

FAM135B has shown to interact with KAT5, a gene that encodes for a histone acetyltransferase through yeast two-hybrid experimentation.

Protein 

The protein encoded on FAM135 is 1406 amino acids long.  The protein contains a region called DUF676, believed to be a putative serine esterase  as well as two protein regions called DUF3657.

Clinical significance 

FAM135B has shown to be expressed in individuals with extrapulmonary tuberculosis.

References